Roswell Historic District may refer to:

Downtown Roswell Historic District, Roswell, New Mexico
Roswell Historic District (Roswell, Georgia), in Roswell, Fulton County, Georgia